AKM Rafiq Ullah Choudhury is a Jatiya Gano Front politician and the former Member of Parliament of Chittagong-3.

Career
Choudhury was elected to parliament from Chittagong-3 as a Jatiya Gano Front candidate in 1979.

References

Jatiya Gano Front politicians
2nd Jatiya Sangsad members
Year of birth missing (living people)
People from Sandwip Upazila
2011 deaths